Noize may refer to:

 Noise music
 Power noise, derivative of noise music and electronic dance music
 Noizemag or noiZe Magazine, a published guide to Circuit parties, gay dance events, and festivals
 DJ Noize (born 1975), Danish DJ
 Boys Noize (born 1982), German electronic music producer and DJ
 Noize MC (born 1985), Russian singer and actor
 "Noize", a song by Jordan from the 2019 album Erys